Martin Van Buren Bates (November 9, 1837 – January 19, 1919), known as the Kentucky Giant, was an American man famed for his great height.

Youth and growth
Bates' growth rate jumped at the age of six or seven.

Civil War
Bates was attending university in Virginia when the Civil War broke out. He subsequently joined the 5th Kentucky Infantry Confederate States Army, later becoming a lieutenant and then captain. He was severely wounded in a battle near the Cumberland Gap and was captured and imprisoned at Camp Chase in Ohio, although he later escaped.

Adulthood and first marriage

He returned to Kentucky after the war. Before the war, his first occupation was as a schoolteacher. While the circus was on tour in Halifax, Canada, the 7-foot-11-inch tall Anna Haining Swan visited. She and Martin soon got to know each other, and were married in 1871. The highly publicized wedding, at St. Martin-in-the-Fields in London, England, drew thousands of people trying to attend, due to both the uncommonness of the spectacle and the couple's disarming good nature. Queen Victoria gave Bates an engraved watch, and gave Swan a satin gown and diamond ring.

They moved to Ohio in 1872, settling in Seville. They built a large house to accommodate themselves comfortably. Martin described the next few years in his autobiography:

Final years
Anna Bates died on August 5, 1888. Martin ordered a statue of her from Europe for her grave, sold the oversized house, and moved into the town. In 1889 he remarried, this time to a woman of normal stature, Annette LaVonne Weatherby, and lived a mostly peaceful life until his death in 1919 of nephritis. He was buried beside his first wife and their son in Seville. He is currently the tallest known person to live to be at least 80 years old.

Some years after his death, a normal height family had purchased the 14-ft ceiling home built by the giant couple. However, the original house in which he and Anna lived burnt down. Later a normal house was built on that site and eventually converted into a museum for the Seville Historical Society.

See also
 List of tallest people

Notes

External links
 
 Martin Van Buren Bates Accessed 22 July 2014.
 The Giants of Seville Accessed 25 April 2011.

1837 births
1919 deaths
American Civil War prisoners of war
American escapees
Confederate States Army officers
Deaths from nephritis
People with gigantism
People from Letcher County, Kentucky
People from Seville, Ohio
People of Kentucky in the American Civil War
World record holders